The Dunlap Institute for Astronomy and Astrophysics at the University of Toronto is an astronomical research centre.

The institute was founded in 2008 with the help of endowed gifts to the University of Toronto from David M. Dunlap and J. Moffat Dunlap, using the proceeds from the sale of the David Dunlap Observatory. The Dunlap Institute is allied with and co-located with the University of Toronto's Department of Astronomy & Astrophysics and with the Canadian Institute for Theoretical Astrophysics, and no longer has any association or connection to the David Dunlap Observatory.

Research 

Astronomers at the Dunlap Institute investigate a variety of topics including:
 
 the structure of the Milky Way Galaxy
cosmic magnetic fields
cosmic explosions
the large scale structure in the universe
Dark Energy
 the Cosmic Microwave Background

Technology & Instrumentation 

Telescope, instrumentation and software projects with leadership from Dunlap scientists include:
 
The Dragonfly Telephoto Array, which comprises many telephoto lens and is designed to detect dim astronomical objects. Dragonfly was co-designed by the U of T's Roberto Abraham and Yale's Pieter van Dokkum.
The Canadian Hydrogen Intensity Mapping Experiment (CHIME)
The South Pole Telescope, designed to study the Cosmic Microwave Background from its location at the South Pole
The Gemini InfraRed Multi-Object Spectrograph (GIRMOS), to be deployed on the Gemini South telescope in Chile in 2024
The Canadian Initiative for Radio Astronomy Data Analysis (CIRADA), which is producing advanced data products for the CHIME, ASKAP and VLA radio telescopes, and which is a pilot project for a Canadian Square Kilometre Array data centre.

Training 

At the Dunlap's annual Introduction to Astronomical Instrumentation Summer School, undergraduate and graduate students from around the world attend lectures and labs. Undergraduate students also pursue summer research projects at the Dunlap Institute's Summer Undergraduate Research Program.

Public outreach 

The Dunlap Institute runs many public outreach events including:

Astronomy on Tap TO
SpaceTime
Cool Cosmos (part of the International Year of Astronomy in 2009)
Transit of Venus viewing (2012)
 Toronto Science Festival (in partnership with U of T Science Engagement) (2013)
 Dunlap Prize Lecture featuring Neil deGrasse Tyson (2014)
 Supermoon Lunar Eclipse viewing (2015)
 Partial Solar Eclipse viewing (2017)
Planet gazing parties, in partnership with the Royal Astronomical Society of Canada

Directors 

 2010 - 2012: James R. Graham
 2012 – 2015: Peter Martin (Acting/Interim)
 2015 – present: Bryan Gaensler

References 

University of Toronto
Astronomy institutes and departments
Astrophysics institutes